was a political party in Japan.

History
The party was established in December 1892 by 14 MPs who had left the Liberal Party after its leader, Hoshi Tōru had been impeached for corruption. It was initially named the Dōshi Club (同志倶楽部), but was renamed Dōshi Seisha after becoming a political association.

It won 18 seats in the March 1894 elections. In May that year it merged with Dōmei Seisha to form Rikken Kakushintō.

Election results

References

Defunct political parties in Japan
Political parties established in 1892
1892 establishments in Japan
Political parties disestablished in 1894
1894 disestablishments in Japan